Darrangamela, commonly known as Darranga mela or Darangamela or Darranga, is a census village in Tamulpur district, Assam, India. As per the 2011 Census of India the village has a total population of 1,123 people including 584 males and 539 females with a literacy rate of 73.02%.

The Darrangamela village is located in India-Bhutan border area. The Darrangamela village carries a long history of militancy-affected areas with activities of both the militants and security forces.

References 

Tamulpur district